German Nicaraguan School is a German international school in Managua, Nicaragua. The school serves up to the senior high school level.

The school was founded in 1967. There was a previous attempt in the 1930s that was halted by World War II. and in August 1968 the Kindergarten opened in a country house at KM 13.5 Carretera Sur. About 50% of the first class were Nicaraguans, and the remainder included Germans and people of other nationalities. The school rented the country house for two years, before moving to KM 10.5 Carretera Sur; classes at the current campus began in 1972, and the primary school was fully established in 1975. The secondary school opened in 1976. The first senior high school graduation occurred in 1981.

References

External links

 German Nicaraguan School
  German Nicaraguan School

Schools in Managua
International schools in Nicaragua